USS Elithro II (SP-15) was an armed motorboat that served in the United States Navy as a patrol vessel from 1917 to 1918.

Elithro II was built in 1916 by Luders Marine Construction Company at Stamford, Connecticut, as a private motorboat of the same name. She had two small funnels abreast amidships.

The U.S. Navy leased Elithro II from her owner, John Kelly Robinson of Rye (town), New York, on 10 November 1917 for World War I service. She was commissioned as USS Elithro II (SP-15) on 26 December 1917.

Elithro II performed intermittent plane guard duty at the Naval Coastal Air Station, Rockaway Beach, Long Island, New York, until returned to her owner on 18 December 1918.

References

Department of the Navy: Naval Historical Center: Online Library of Selected Images: Civilian Ships: Elithro II (American Motor Boat, 1916). Served as USS Elithro II (SP-15) in 1917-1918
NavSource Online: Section Patrol Craft Photo Archive Elithro II (SP 15)

Patrol vessels of the United States Navy
World War I patrol vessels of the United States
Ships built in Stamford, Connecticut
1916 ships